Line in the Sand is the third studio album by ZOX. It was released on January 22, 2008, through SideOneDummy Records.

Track listing
"Line in the Sand" – 4:31
"When the Rain comes Down Again" – 3:40
"Goodnight" – 3:02
"Seventh Avenue Prophet" – 4:01
"Towards Los Angeles" – 3:57
"I Miss You" – 3:46
"Another Attack" – 3:15
"The Wait (Part II)" – 3:21
"The Same (Doesn't Feel the Same)" – 3:33
"Don't Believe in Love" – 4:12
"Lucky Sometimes" – 4:31

The first two singles from the album were "Goodnight" and "Line in the Sand". On the day of the record's release, ZOX signed autographs and played a free show inside a Newbury Comics store near their home town in Warwick, RI.

2008 albums
ZOX albums
Line in the Sand